Rob Johnson may refer to:

Rob Johnson (American football) (born 1973), American football quarterback
Rob Johnson (baseball) (born 1982), baseball player
Rob Johnson (footballer, born 1962), English football player
Rob Johnson (musician) (born 1971), Canadian musician
Rob Johnson (news anchor) (born 1968), principal news anchor at WBBM-TV in Chicago
Rob Johnson (Australian politician) (born 1943), Liberal member of the Western Australian Legislative Assembly
Rob Johnson (Seattle politician), politician on the Seattle City Council
Rob Johnson (soccer) (born 1973), American soccer player

See also
Robert Johnson (disambiguation)
Bob Johnson (disambiguation)
Ron Johnson (disambiguation)
Robb Johnson (born 1955), British musician
Bobby Johnson (born 1951), college football coach